Abu Isa al-Warraq, full name Abū ʿĪsā Muḥammad ibn Hārūn al-Warrāq (died 861-2 AD/247 AH), was a 9th-century Arab skeptic scholar and critic of Islam and religion in general. He was a mentor and friend of scholar Ibn al-Rawandi in whose work The Book of the Emerald he appears. A modern critic of Islam, Ibn Warraq, derives his pseudonym from al-Warraq.

Views of revealed religions
Al-Warraq was skeptical of the existence of God.  He wrote "He who orders his slave to do things that he knows him to be incapable of doing, then punishes him, is a fool," referring to a God that would order humans to act in unrealistic ways then punish them for failing.

Al-Warraq challenged the notion of revealed religion. He argued that if humans are capable of figuring out that, for instance, it is good to be forgiving, then a prophet is unnecessary, and that we should not heed the claims of self-appointed prophets, if what is claimed is found to be contrary to good sense and reason. Al-Warraq admired the intellect not for its capacity to submit to a god, but rather for its inquisitiveness towards the wonders of science. He explained that people developed the science of astronomy by gazing at the sky, and that no prophet was necessary to show them how to gaze; he also said that no prophets were needed to show them how to make flutes, either, or how to play them.

Views of Islam
Al-Warraq doubted claims portraying Muhammad as a prophet:

Views on Christianity
Few Arab scholars of the period directly engaged with Christianity, partially due to a lack of access to Christian scriptures in Arabic, and partially due to a belief that Christian documents were defective and unfruitful to study.  Al-Warraq wrote Radd ʿalā al-thalāth firaq min al-Naṣārā ("The Refutation of three Christian sects"), one of the most detailed attacks on Christianity of the period, where he shows unusual familiarity with Christian theology and history.  He criticizes the conflicting notions of the Incarnation of Jesus as contradictory, that he was both human and divine.  He cites how Christian denominations themselves have struggled and disagreed with each other on the meaning of the Incarnation and the Trinity.

References

9th-century people from the Abbasid Caliphate
Former Muslim critics of Islam
Freethought
Place of birth unknown
889 births
994 deaths
9th-century Arabs
Shia hadith scholars
Critics of religions